Caged Desires is a 1970 exploitation film, the first writing credit for filmmaker Barbara Peeters, and directed by frequent Ed Wood collaborator Donald A. Davis. It is a women-in-prison drama dealing with a power battle between long-term inmates over their newest cellmate.

Cast
Barbara Peeters
Connie Barney
Susan Francis
Lu Tomeny
Fern Holbrook
Victoria Carbe
Thareen Auroraa
Buzz Hinkley
Willa Arste
Linda Jeanne

Synopsis
16-year-old Maggie is jailed for performing an illegal (and fatal) abortion on a girl friend. While inside she is the subject of hostile advances from two rival cellmates, Brucie and Cat, and eventually finds love with Angel, a previous subject of the predatory women.

Release
Caged Desires was produced by Hollywood Cinema Associates. According to the film's co-writer, Barbara Peeters, the film was shot in about 1967, even though it was not released until 1970. The film bore an X rating (possibly self-imposed) upon its initial release.

The film's publicity material read: "The management believes that you as an adult are entitled to satisfy your intellectual and emotional needs by viewing this film. We also believe in free choice. Accordingly, if you believe you are likely to be shocked or offended by this film, we will gladly refund your money if you appear at the box-office with the stub of your ticket within the next three minutes."

See also
 List of American films of 1970

References

External links

1970s exploitation films
American exploitation films
1970s English-language films
1970s American films